Dmytro Osadchyi (born 5 August 1992) is a Ukrainian-Israeli football midfielder who plays for F.C. Kiryat Yam.

Career 
Osadchyi is a product of the Kirovohrad and Kyiv youth sportive school systems.

He played in the Ukrainian Second League (FC CSKA Kyiv, FC Sumy) and in the Ukrainian First League (FC Dynamo-2 Kyiv, FC Zirka Kirovohrad) clubs. In February 2015 he signed a contract with the Belarusian Premier League club FC Granit Mikashevichi.

In 2017, he moved to Israel and accepted Israeli citizenship.

References

External links
 
 
 
 

1992 births
Living people
Ukrainian Jews
Israeli footballers
Ukrainian footballers
Ukrainian emigrants to Israel
Association football midfielders
Expatriate footballers in Belarus
Ukrainian expatriate footballers
FC CSKA Kyiv players
FC Dynamo-2 Kyiv players
FC Oleksandriya players
PFC Sumy players
FC Zirka Kropyvnytskyi players
FC Granit Mikashevichi players
FC Hirnyk-Sport Horishni Plavni players
Hapoel Beit She'an F.C. players
F.C. Tzeirei Kafr Kanna players
F.C. Haifa Robi Shapira players
Ironi Nesher F.C. players
Sportspeople from Kropyvnytskyi